V&A Digital Futures is a series of events organized by the Victoria and Albert Museum (V&A) in the area of digital art.

Digital Futures events are organized by Irini Papadimitriou of the V&A, who started the events in 2012, some at the V&A museum itself and some elsewhere around London especially but also elsewhere in the United Kingdom. Some Digital Futures events have been held in conjunction with the annual EVA London conference. There are some associated publications.

The V&A museum has a significant collection of computer art.

See also
 EVA London
 Lumen Prize

References

External links
 Digital Futures on the V&A website

2012 establishments in England
Organizations established in 2012
Arts organisations based in the United Kingdom
Cultural organisations based in London
Events in the United Kingdom
Arts events
Museum events
Victoria and Albert Museum
Digital art